Agroeca proxima is a species of spider belonging to the family Liocranidae.

It is native to Europe.

References

Liocranidae
Spiders described in 1871
Spiders of Europe